The Copa El Salvador is the top knock-out football tournament in El Salvador. The first edition was played in 1999, resulting champion C.D. Águila of El Salvador. From 2000 to 2006, the competition was played two more times with Atlético Balboa and Once Municipal winning the cup. After a lengthy hiatus that began in 2006,  was restored in 2016 The cup is currently sponsored by Claro and thus officially known as the Copa Claro.
The Cup tournament is played as a separate tournament from the league (played between First, Second and Third Division).

Format Change
In 2014, the tournament was briefly brought back played between Águila and FAS. However, the cup turned out to be a one-off event.

Re-launch
On June 16, 2016 it was announced that a new cup competition would be played during Apertura 2016 and Clausura 2017. The tournament will involve 12 teams from the First Division, plus 10 of the Second Division and 10 of the Third Division for a total of 32 participants. The teams will be placed into 8 groups of 4. The 8 group winners, plus the 8 group runners-up, move on to the new round (round of 16).

The cup will be called Copa Claro for sponsorship reason and the winner will receive 15,000 dollars.

List of finals

Copa Presidente (1939–2022)

Copa Presidente/Independencia (2014–15)

Copa Claro (2016–present)

List of winners

References

External links
http://www.elsalvador.com/noticias/2006/11/23/deportes/dep1.asp
El Salvador - List of Cup Finals, RSSSF.com

Cup
El Salvador